Doda Assembly constituency is one of the 90 constituencies in the Jammu and Kashmir Legislative Assembly of Jammu and Kashmir a north state of India. Doda is also part of Udhampur Lok Sabha constituency.

Members of Legislative Assembly

Election results

2014

See also 

 Doda
 Doda West
 List of constituencies of the Jammu and Kashmir Legislative Assembly

References 

Assembly constituencies of Jammu and Kashmir
Doda district